The Saxon Palace was one of the most distinctive buildings in prewar Warsaw, Poland. It was destroyed by German armed forces in World War II and not rebuilt since. Ground work commenced in August 2022, after the Polish Government announced a plan regarding reconstruction of the building. It is expected to be completed by 2030.

History

Up to World War I
The Saxon Palace had been preceded by a dwór belonging to Tobiasz Morsztyn.  After 1661 his brother and heir Jan Andrzej Morsztyn had replaced the dwór with a baroque palace (Pałac Morsztynów, "the Morsztyn Palace") with four towers.

In 1713 the Morsztyn Palace was purchased by the first of Poland's two Saxon kings, Augustus II (reigned in Poland 1697–1706 and 1709–33), who began enlarging it.  In 1748 the palace's rebuilding was completed by his son, King Augustus III.

In the early 19th century, the Saxon Palace housed the Warsaw Lyceum in which Frédéric Chopin's father Nicolas Chopin taught French, living with his family on the palace grounds.

The Palace was remodelled in 1842.

Interbellum

After World War I, the Saxon Palace was the seat of the Polish General Staff. In 1925, the Tomb of the Unknown Soldier was established within the colonnade-topped arcade that joined the Palace's two symmetric wings.

The Palace continued to be sandwiched between the Saxon Garden, to its rear, and the Saxon Square in front (which would be renamed Piłsudski Square after the Marshal's death in 1935).

In this building, the German Enigma machine cipher was first broken in December 1932 and then read for several years before the General Staff Cipher Bureau German section's 1937 move to new, specially designed quarters near Pyry in the Kabaty Woods south of Warsaw.

During World War II, after the German suppression of the 1944 Warsaw Uprising, the Saxon Palace was blown up by the Germans as part of their planned destruction of Warsaw.  Only parts of the central arcade remained, housing the Tomb of the Unknown Soldier, which escaped destruction.

Since World War II
There are plans to reconstruct the Saxon Palace. The palace cellars were excavated in 2006, uncovering some 20,000 objects. The palace's reconstruction was formerly scheduled for completion by 2010. The reconstructed building was planned to house Warsaw's city hall, but due to Warsaw's budget problems caused by the Great Recession (2000s), and subsequent cuts, the reconstruction has been on hold. On 11 November 2018, in celebration of the 100th anniversary of Poland's post-World War I independence, President Andrzej Duda reaffirmed the intent to rebuild the palace.

Gallery

See also

 Saxon Axis
 Brühl Palace
 Planned destruction of Warsaw

References

 Władysław Kozaczuk, Enigma:  How the German Machine Cipher Was Broken, and How It Was Read by the Allies in World War II, edited and translated by Christopher Kasparek, Frederick, Maryland, University Publications of America, 1984, .

External links
  Warsaw before 1939
  Picture gallery of Saxon Square
  History of the Saxon Palace and the Saxon Axis

Houses completed in the 17th century
Houses completed in the 18th century
Houses completed in the 19th century
Neoclassical architecture in Warsaw
Palaces in Warsaw
Royal residences in Poland
Buildings and structures in Poland destroyed during World War II
Demolished buildings and structures in Poland
Former palaces in Poland
Former buildings and structures in Poland